Charikleia Pantazi (born 18 March 1985 in Athens) is a Greek rhythmic gymnast. She won a bronze medal at the 2000 Summer Olympics.

References

External links 
 
 

Living people
1985 births
Greek rhythmic gymnasts
Gymnasts from Athens
Olympic gymnasts of Greece
Olympic bronze medalists for Greece
Gymnasts at the 2000 Summer Olympics
Olympic medalists in gymnastics
Medalists at the 2000 Summer Olympics
20th-century Greek women
21st-century Greek women